The Battle of Mam Garvia, took place in 1187 in Northern Scotland. Domnall Meic Uilleim had resisted the King of Scots since at least 1179, he even had a claim to the throne as a grandson of King Donnchad II of Scotland. Lochlann, Lord of Galloway led an army north where according to Roger of Hoveden they defeated the Meic Uilleim, slew Domnall and cut off his head and carried it south to present it to King William. The actual site of the battle has been quoted as being either in Ross or near Moray, lately it has been reasoned to be in Strath Garve near Dingwall.

References
 McDonald, R. Andrew, Outlaws of Medieval Scotland: Challenges to the Canmore Kings, 1058-1266, East Linton, 2003.  [McDonald, Outlaws of Medieval Scotland]
 Barrow, G.W.S, Scotland and its Neighbours in the Middle Ages, (London, 1992)

Sources
HOWDEN, R ''Gesta Regis Henrici Secundi Benedicti Abbatis, ed. W. Stubbs (Rolls Series, London, 1867).

1187 in Scotland
12th century in Scotland
Battles involving Scotland
Battles of the Middle Ages
Conflicts in 1187